Khubbayza was a Palestinian Arab village in the Haifa Subdistrict, located  southeast of Haifa. It was situated on hilly terrain, south of Wadi al-Sindiyana, between the Jezreel Valley with the Mediterranean coast. In 1945, it had a population of 290. Khubbayza was depopulated during the 1948 War on May 12, 1948, in the Battle of Mishmar HaEmek.

History
The village is named after the Arabic term for mallow, a wild plant used in Palestinian cuisine, particularly in rural areas. To the north of Khubbayza laid the ruins of Khirbat Kalba, named after Banu Kalb, the Arab tribe. It contained traces of human settlement.

In 1859, Khubbayza had  an estimated 270 inhabitants  who cultivated 24 feddans of land, while Victor Guérin, who visited in 1870,  found the village to have 400 inhabitant.

In 1882  the PEF's Survey of Western Palestine described Khobbeizeh as a "village of moderate size on high ground, with wells in the valley to the south."

A population list from about 1887 showed that  el Khobbeizeh had about  315 inhabitants, all Muslim.

British Mandate era
In the 1922 census of Palestine conducted by the British Mandate authorities, Khubaizeh had a population 140, all Muslims, increasing in the  1931 census to 209, still all  Muslims, in a total of 42 houses.

In this period, it was oriented along a northwest axis and its houses, constructed of stone, were clustered together.  The villagers earned their living in agriculture, mostly cultivating grains and vegetables, but also worked in animal husbandry. Domestic water was obtained from numerous springs and wells within Khubbayza's boundaries.

In the 1945 statistics, it had a population of 290 Muslim inhabitants, and the total land area was 4,854 dunams. Of the land, Arabs used 65  dunams for plantations and irrigable land, 2,295 for cereals, while 11 dunams were built-up (urban) land.

1948 and aftermath
Israel's pre-military force, the Haganah, launched a raid against the village on January 1, 1948, but no casualties were reported. It was not captured until several months later, however. In the wake of the Battle of Mishmar HaEmek in mid April 1948, several of the surrounding villages were occupied by the Haganah. The Irgun, a Jewish paramilitary group, took advantage of Israel's gains and Khubbayza was one of several other villages captured between May 12 and May 14. Most of the inhabitants fled after mortar attacks. Following the war the area was incorporated into the State of Israel and the lands of Khubbayza were left undeveloped. According to Palestinian historian Walid Khalidi, in 1992 the site consisted of only "stone debris, scattered among thorny bushes."

References

Bibliography

External links

Welcome To Khubbayza
Khubbayza,  Zochrot
Survey of Western Palestine, Map 8:  IAA, Wikimedia commons 
Khubbayza from Khalil Sakakini Cultural Center
Khubbayza, from Zochrot
Khubbayza Tour, May 21, 2011, Zochrot
Remembering Khubbayza, booklet, 05/2011, Zochrot

Arab villages depopulated prior to the 1948 Arab–Israeli War
District of Haifa